Jean-Kasongo Banza (born 26 June 1974) is a retired professional footballer from the DR Congo who played in DR Congo for AS Vita Club, in Turkey for Gençlerbirliği, in South Korea for Chunnam Dragons and Cheonan Ilhwa Chunma (currently Seongnam FC), in Tunisia for CS Sfaxien and Olympique Béja, and in Germany for VfL Wolfsburg and MSV Duisburg. At international level, he represented the DR Congo national team.

References

External links
 
 
 
 
 

1974 births
Living people
Footballers from Kinshasa
Association football forwards
Democratic Republic of the Congo footballers
Democratic Republic of the Congo expatriate footballers
Democratic Republic of the Congo international footballers
AS Vita Club players
Gençlerbirliği S.K. footballers
Jeonnam Dragons players
Seongnam FC players
VfL Wolfsburg players
MSV Duisburg players
CS Sfaxien players
Olympique Béja players
Süper Lig players
K League 1 players
Bundesliga players
2. Bundesliga players
Expatriate footballers in Turkey
Expatriate footballers in Tunisia
Expatriate footballers in South Korea
Expatriate footballers in Germany
Democratic Republic of the Congo expatriate sportspeople in Turkey
Democratic Republic of the Congo expatriate sportspeople in Tunisia
Democratic Republic of the Congo expatriate sportspeople in South Korea
Democratic Republic of the Congo expatriate sportspeople in Germany
1996 African Cup of Nations players
1998 African Cup of Nations players
2000 African Cup of Nations players
21st-century Democratic Republic of the Congo people